The House of Stolberg  is the name of an old and large German dynasty of the former Holy Roman Empire's high aristocracy (Hoher Adel). Members of the family held the title of Fürst and Graf. They played a significant role in feudal Germany's history and, as a mediatized dynasty, enjoyed princely privileges until the collapse of the German Empire in 1918. The house has numerous branches.

History 
There are over ten different theories about the origin of the counts of Stolberg, but none has been commonly accepted. Stolbergs themselves claimed descent from the 6th century Italian noble, Otto Colonna. This claim was symbolized by the column device on the Stolberg arms. However, it is most likely that they are descended from the counts of Hohnstein, when in 1222 Heinrich I of Hohnstein wrested the county from Ludwig III. The first representative of this family, Count Henry of Stolberg, appears in a 1210 document, having already been mentioned in 1200 as Count Henry of Voigtstedt. Although Voigtstedt near Artern was the initial seat of this comital family, it had moved to Stolberg (Harz) no later than the beginning of the 13th century. The castle there remained in the hands of the family until they were dispossessed as part of the 1945 land reform in the Soviet Zone of occupation in Germany created after the Second World War.

In 1429 the counts of Stolberg succeeded in purchasing the County of Wernigerode in the Northern Harz as part of a contract of inheritance and thereby extended their area of influence considerably.

In 1645 the house was permanently divided into the Older Main Line (Ältere Hauptlinie) of Stolberg-Wernigerode and the Younger Main Line (Jüngere Hauptlinie) of Stolberg-Stolberg. At the beginning of the 18th century, the lines of Stolberg-Gedern (to 1804) and Stolberg-Schwarza (to 1748) branched off from Stolberg-Wernigerode. In 1706, Stolberg-Stolberg was divided into the two lines of Stolberg-Stolberg and Stolberg-Rossla.

In 1742 representatives of the line of Stolberg-Gedern were elevated to the Estate of Imperial Princes (Reichsfürstenstand) by Emperor Charles VII.

In the 18th century, as a result of mediatisation, the imperially immediate counts of Stolberg-Wernigerode were forced to subordinate themselves to the Kingdom of Prussia and the counts of Stolberg-Stolberg and Stolberg-Roßla likewise to the Electorate of Saxony. On the dissolution of the Holy Roman Empire's German nation in 1806 the Stolbergs lost their imperial comital status and, in 1815, finally became mediatized Prussian princes. However, the families retained certain privileges as to the Lutheran state churches of their mediatised state countries and had heritable seats in the Prussian House of Lords.

The head of each comital branch and his first-born son or heir presumptive in the Houses of Stolberg-Wernigerode, Stolberg-Stolberg and Stolberg-Roßla were granted permission on 22 October 1890 and 1893 respectively by Emperor Wilhelm II to bear princely titles. In 1980 a branch of the line of Stolberg-Stolberg was incorporated into the Dutch nobility as counts without, however, acknowledgement of their princely title.

Former territories, estates and seats (selection)

Territories
 County of Stolberg (1200–1945)
 County of Wernigerode (1429–1945)
 County of Stolberg-Rossla (1341–1945)
 Barony of Gedern (Hesse) (the castle 1535-1987, the estate until today)
 Barony of Schwarza, Thuringia
 Hohnstein Castle (Harz)
 Elbingerode (Harz) (1427–1600)
 Kelbra
 Heringen, Thuringia

Estates
 Allstedt (1542–1575)
 Ebersburg (Harz)
 Erichsberg Castle
 Ernstburg
 Grasburg (Rottleberode)
 Heinrichsberg Castle
 Hirzenhain, Hesse (since 1535 until today)
 Ilsenburg Abbey and Ilsenburg House, Thuringia (16th century - 1945)
 Jannowitz, Silesia
 Königstein Castle (1535–1581)
 Kreppelhof, Silesia
 Morungen
 Oberröblingen
 Ortenberg, Hesse  (since 1535 until today)
 Peterswaldau, Silesia
 Hofgut Ranstadt, Hesse (1535 until today)

The counts of Stolberg also had claims to the Belgian Agimont and bore this name in their title. However, an orthographic error crept in and it was not until an edict of 6 December 1780 that Count Christian Frederick of Stolberg-Wernigerode corrected the hitherto erroneous name of Aigmont to Agimont.

Important members of the family (selection)

Early rulers of Stolberg county 
 Heinrich I (ruled 1222–1231)
 Heinrich II (ruled 1231–1282)
 Heinrich III (ruled 1282–1303)
 Count Henry of Stolberg (ruled 1303–1347; died 1357), Bishop of Merseburg (1341–1357)
 Heinrich VI (ruled 1347–1368), Bishop of Merseburg (1384–1393)
 Count Botho of Stolberg the Elder (died 1455)
 Countess Katharina of Stolberg (1463–1535), Abbess of Drübeck Abbey
 Count Henry the Younger of Stolberg (1467–1508), Governor of Frisia
 Count Botho of Stolberg (1467–1538)
 Count Wolfgang of Stolberg (1501–1552)
 Anna II of Stolberg (1504–1574), imperial abbess of Quedlinburg
 Anna III of Stolberg (1565–1601), imperial abbess of Quedlinburg
 Count Louis of Stolberg (1505–1574)
 Countess Juliana of Stolberg (1506–1580)
 Count Henry of Stolberg (1509–1572)
 Count Wolf Ernest of Stolberg (1546–1606)
 Count Henry Ernest of Stolberg (1593–1672), founder of the Elder Main Line of the House of Stolberg
 Count John Martin of Stolberg (1594–1669), founder of the Younger Main Line of the House of Stolberg
 Count Ernest of Stolberg (1650–1710)

Line of Stolberg-Wernigerode 
 Count Christian Ernest of Stolberg-Wernigerode (1691–1771)
 Count Henry Ernest of Stolberg-Wernigerode (1716–1778)
 Count Christian Frederick of Stolberg-Wernigerode (1746–1824)
 Countess Louise of Stolberg-Wernigerode (1771–1856), Abbess of Drübeck Abbey
 Count Henry of Stolberg-Wernigerode (1772–1854)
 Count Anthony of Stolberg-Wernigerode (1785–1854)
 Count William of Stolberg-Wernigerode (1807–1898), Prussian politician and general
 Count Eberhard of Stolberg-Wernigerode (1810–1872)
 Countess Anna of Stolberg-Wernigerode (1819–1868), Matron of Bethany (Oberin zu Bethanien)
 Count Bolko of Stolberg-Wernigerode (1823–1884), Landrat of the district of Franzburg
 Count Theodore of Stolberg-Wernigerode (1827–1902), member of the German Reichstag
 Countess Eleonora of Stolberg-Wernigerode (1835–1903)
 Prince Otto of Stolberg-Wernigerode (1837–1896), Governor of the Prince of Hanover, German Vice-Chancellor under Bismarck
 Princess Anna of Stolberg-Wernigerode (1837–1907), wife of Prince Otto
 Count Udo of Stolberg-Wernigerode (1840–1910)
 Count Constantine of Stolberg-Wernigerode (1843–1905), Governor of the Province of Hanover
 Magdalene, Countess of Stolberg-Wernigerode (1875–1955), Abbess of Drübeck Abbey
 Albert, Count of Stolberg-Wernigerode (1886–1948)
 Otto Count of Stolberg-Wernigerode (1893–1984)

Line of Stolberg-Gedern 
 Prince Frederick Charles of Stolberg-Gedern (1693–1767)
 Princess Louise of Stolberg-Gedern (1752–1824)
 Princess Caroline of Stolberg-Gedern (1755–1828)

Line of Stolberg-Stolberg 
 Countess Sophie Eleonora of Stolberg-Stolberg (1669–1745), funeral sermon compiler
 Count Christopher Frederick of Stolberg-Stolberg (1672–1738 in Stolberg) was a German regent
 Count Christian of Stolberg-Stolberg (1748–1821), translator and lyricist
 Count Frederick Leopold of Stolberg-Stolberg (1750–1819), poet, translator and lawyer
 Countess Augusta Louise of Stolberg-Stolberg (1753–1835)
 Countess Marianne of Stolberg-Stolberg (1780–1814)
 Count John Peter Cajus of Stolberg-Stolberg (1797–1874), manorial estate owner and Reichstag member
 Count Leopold Frederick of Stolberg-Stolberg (1799–1840)
 Countess Louise of Stolberg-Stolberg (1799–1875), lyricist, translator and editor
 Count Joseph Theodore of Stolberg-Stolberg (1804–1859)
 Count Alfred of Stolberg-Stolberg (1835–1880), manorial estate owner and Reichstag member
 Count Frederick of Stolberg-Stolberg (1836–1904), territorial lord and Reichstag member
 Count Adalbert of Stolberg-Stolberg (1840–1885), manorial estate owner and Reichstag member
 Hermann Joseph Count of Stolberg-Stolberg (1854–1925)
 Christoph Count of Stolberg-Stolberg (1888–1968), major general
 Frederick-Leopold Count of Stolberg-Stolberg (born 1962), lawyer
 Bishop Rupert Ferdinand Carl Thaddäus Antonius Maria Graf von Stolberg-Stolberg (born 1970)

Line of Stolberg-Roßla 
 Count Jost Christian of Stolberg-Roßla senior (1676–1739) married Auguste Eleanore Gebser 
 Count Frederick Botho of Stolberg-Roßla (1714–1768), Regent in Roßla from 1739
 Count Jost Christian of Stolberg-Roßla junior (1722–1749)
 Count William Christoph of Stolberg-Roßla (1748–1826), Regent of the County of Stolberg-Roßla

Coat of arms
Family coat of arms : In Gold ein schreitender schwarzer Hirsch; auf dem Helm mit schwarz-goldenen Decken ein natürlicher Pfauenschweif zwischen 2 silbernen Straußenfedern.

Sources 
 
 
 Genealogisches Handbuch des Adels, Fürstliche Häuser, Band XVIII, 2007
 Philipp Fürst zu Stolberg-Wernigerode und Jost-Christian Fürst zu Stolberg-Stolberg (ed.): Stolberg 1210–2010: Zur achthundertjährigen Geschichte des Geschlechts. Verlag Janos Stekovics, Dößel 2010, .

References

External links 

Wappen der "Graffen von Stollnbergk“ in Ortenburger Wappenbuch of 1466
 Wappen der Grafen von Stolberg in Wappenbuch besonders deutscher Geschlechter, Augsburg, 1515 - 1650
 Literature about the counts of Stolberg in the Wildenfels Castle Archives

 
Stolberg
Stolberg
Stolberg
Stolberg